San Marcos Airport  is a high elevation airport serving the city of San Marcos, the capital of San Marcos Department in Guatemala. The airport is on the southwest side of the city.

San Marcos is in a high mountain basin. There is nearby mountainous terrain north and south of the airport, and distant mountainous terrain to the east and west.

See also
 Transport in Guatemala
 List of airports in Guatemala

References

External links
 OurAirports - San Marcos
 OpenStreetMap - San Marcos
 FallingRain - San Marcos
 

Airports in Guatemala
San Marcos Department